Ludovica Cavalli (born 20 December 2000) is an Italian athlete who specialises in middle-distance running. She competed in the women's 3000 metres event at the 2021 European Athletics Indoor Championships.

Career
Cavalli finished in sixth place at the 2019 European U-20 Championships in the 3000 meter steeplechase. In 2019 she won the team silver medal in the European cross championships 2019 in Lisbon. Two years later in Dublin she is instead a gold medal, again with the team at the European cross championships, this time in the upper category for the under-23s.

In 2022, Cavalli won three senior Italian titles: in the cross-country short race, indoor in the 3000 m and outdoor in the 1500 m. She subsequently her her second call up in the Italy national athletics team at the Mediterranean Games in Oran where she won the bronze medal in the 1500 m.

Achievements

National titles
Cavalli has won six national championshis at individual senior level.

Italian Athletics Championships
1500 m: 2022

Italian Athletics Indoor Championships
1500 m: 2023
3000 m: 2022, 2023

Italian Cross Country Championships
Short course: 2022, 2023

References

External links

2000 births
Living people
Italian female middle-distance runners
Italian female steeplechase runners
Italian female cross country runners
Sportspeople from Genoa
Athletics competitors of Centro Sportivo Aeronautica Militare
Athletes (track and field) at the 2022 Mediterranean Games
Mediterranean Games medalists in athletics
Mediterranean Games bronze medalists for Algeria